Jordan Joshua M. Chiedozie (born 1 August 1994) is an English footballer who plays for Ramsgate as a forward.

Career
Born in Bournemouth, Chiedozie joined Bournemouth's youth system in 2007, aged 13. On 26 October 2012 he joined Dorchester Town in a one-month loan deal.

Chiedozie only appeared in two league matches before returning to the Cherries. On 11 January 2013 he was loaned to Totton, also in a month's deal. Chiedozie made an instant impact at the club, scoring one and assisting the other three goals in a 4–0 home routing over Kettering Town, being also named man of the match. However, he picked up a knee injury in his 3rd game that ruled him out for the rest of his loan spell.

Chiedozie moved to Poole Town in another month's loan on 25 October 2013. However, he only appeared in two FA Cup matches before returning to Bournemouth. On 10 January of the following year he rejoined Poole, and appeared more regularly.

In February 2014 Chiedozie was released by the Cherries, and joined Poole permanently shortly after.

On 7 August 2014 Chiedozie signed with Concord Rangers. After scoring seven goals in only 14 matches, he signed an 18-month deal with League Two side Cambridge United on 28 November. He made his professional debut a day later, starting in a 2–1 away win against AFC Wimbledon. In March 2015, he joined Conference Premier strugglers Dartford on loan until the end of the season.

In December 2015 Chiedozie's contract with Cambridge United was terminated by mutual consent.

As of 2016, Chiedozie signed for Boreham Wood.

On 22 September 2016, Concord Rangers announced the re-signing of Chiedozie, following his release from Boreham Wood.

On 21 July 2018, after a prolific spell at Margate, Chiedozie signed for Chelmsford City. On 9 May 2019, following a number of injuries throughout the season, Chiedozie was released by Chelmsford. In October 2019, Chiedozie signed for Isthmian League club Bishop's Stortford, scoring on his debut on 12 October 2019 in a 2–0 win against Horsham.

Prior to the 2021–22 season, Chiedozie returned to Kent to join Ramsgate.

Personal life
Chiedozie's father, John, was also a footballer. A winger, he was born in Nigeria but spent his whole career in England.

Career statistics

References

External links

1994 births
Living people
Footballers from Bournemouth
English footballers
English sportspeople of Nigerian descent
Association football forwards
AFC Bournemouth players
Dorchester Town F.C. players
A.F.C. Totton players
Poole Town F.C. players
Concord Rangers F.C. players
Cambridge United F.C. players
Dartford F.C. players
Braintree Town F.C. players
Boreham Wood F.C. players
Margate F.C. players
Chelmsford City F.C. players
Bishop's Stortford F.C. players
Ramsgate F.C. players
National League (English football) players
English Football League players
Isthmian League players
Black British sportspeople